From Afar is the fourth studio album by Finnish folk metal band Ensiferum, released on 9 September 2009 on Spinefarm Records. It is the band's first album to feature keyboardist Emmi Silvennoinen. The album was produced by Nightwish producer Tero Kinnunen and Victory Songs producer Janne Joutsenniemi. It was mixed by HIM producer Hiili Hiilesmaa. The limited edition of the album includes a cover of Swedish folk rock group Nordman.

Track listing

Charts

Personnel

Band members
Petri Lindroos – harsh vocals, guitars
Markus Toivonen – guitars, acoustic guitar, clean and backing vocals, banjo
Sami Hinkka – bass, clean and backing vocals
Janne Parviainen – drums
Emmi Silvennoinen – keyboards, hammond, backing vocals

Guest members
Heri Joensen (Týr) - lead vocals (on "Vandraren")
Kaisa Saari - female vocals (on "Twilight Tavern")
Timo Väänänen - kantele
Tobias Tåg - flute, tin whistles, recorder
Olli Varis - mandolin, mandola
Jenni Turku - recorder
Olli Ahvenlahti - piano
Lassi Logren - nyckelharpa
Mikko P. Mustonen - orchestration, whistle
Jukka-Pekka Miettinen - backing vocals

Production
Tero Kinnunen – production
Janne Joutsenniemi – production
Hiili Hiilesmaa – mixing
Kai Hahto – drum tech

References

2009 albums
Ensiferum albums